Standing ovation is a form of applause where members of a seated audience applaud while standing up.

Standing ovation may also refer to:

Standing Ovation (film), a 2010 musical film
"Standing Ovation" (song), a 1980 single by GQ
"Standing Ovation", a song by American rapper Young Jeezy from the 2005 album Let's Get It: Thug Motivation 101
Standing Ovation: The Greatest Songs from the Stage, a 2012 album by Susan Boyle
Standing Ovation (Count Basie album), 1969